"Apollo" is a song by Dutch producer and DJ Hardwell. It features vocals from Australian singer and songwriter Amba Shepherd. It is the first single from Hardwell's compilation, Hardwell Presents Revealed Volume 4.

Background 
Upon receiving three million followers on Facebook, Hardwell released a private edit of the song for free to celebrate. An acoustic version of the song was released. The song was certified platinum by the NVPI. A remixes EP was released, featuring remixes from Dash Berlin, Noisecontrollers, Lucky Date and Psychic Type.

Track listing

Charts

Weekly charts

Year-end charts

References 

2012 songs
2012 singles
Hardwell songs
Songs written by Hardwell